Bagh-e Shad (Romanized as Bāgh-e Shād) is a village in Ij Rural District, in Central District of Estahban County, Fars Province, Iran. At 2006 census, population was 443, in 97 families.

References 

Populated places in Estahban County